The Highlanders may refer to:

Highlanders (rugby union), a professional rugby union team
Highlanders (Seaforth, Gordons and Camerons), the 4th Battalion of the Royal Regiment of Scotland
The Highlanders Shinty Club, a shinty club representing the British Army
The Highlanders (professional wrestling), professional wrestling tag team that formerly worked for WWE
The Highlanders (Doctor Who), a Doctor Who serial
NorthEast United Nickname of an ISL team.

See also
Highlander (disambiguation)